The Oddi altarpiece, or more correctly the degli Oddi altarpiece, is an altarpiece of the Coronation of the Virgin painted in 1502-1504 by the Italian Renaissance master Raphael for the altar of the Oddi family chapel in the church of San Francesco al Prato in Perugia, Italy, now in the Vatican Pinacoteca. The altarpiece was commissioned for the Oddi family chapel in San Francesco al Prato in Perugia, was taken to Paris in 1797 (for the Musée Napoleon) and in 1815 brought back to Italy, not to Perugia but to the Vatican Pinacoteca.
 	
The altarpiece was commissioned by Leandra Baglioni, widow of Simone degli Oddi; in Perugia there were different Oddi and degli Oddi families, but English sources often ignore this, including the English version of the Vatican Museums website..

The crowning of the Virgin 
The actions of the painting occur in two related scenes, one in heaven and the other terrestrial. Above the coronation shows the Virgin being crowned by Jesus, while angels are playing music; while below the section depicts the apostles gathering around the empty tomb of Mary, whose body was raised to heaven without corruption. St Thomas holds in his hands the girdle Mary dropped down to him as a testament to her assumption. The saints raise their eyes to the heavenly spectacle.

The predella 
The predella (39 × 190 cm) is composed of three 27 × 50 cm paintings, showing scenes of The Life of the Virgin:
The Annunciation, The Adoration of the Magi, Presentation in the Temple

See also
List of paintings by Raphael

Notes

External links 
 The altarpiece and the predella at the Vatican Pinacotheca.
 The altarpiece and the left, center and right part of the predella at the Web Gallery of Art.
 

Paintings by Raphael
1500s paintings
Paintings in the collection of the Vatican Museums
Raphael
Altarpieces
Musical instruments in art
Dogs in art
Horses in art
Adoration of the Magi in art
Paintings of apostles
Raphael
Paintings depicting the Annunciation